IKKiCON is an annual three-day anime convention held during January at the Kalahari Resorts and Conventions in Round Rock, Texas.

Programming
The convention typically offers live entertainment, musical performances, panels, screening rooms, vendors, video games, and workshops.

History
IKKiCON was created in 2007, originally taking the date of Ushicon, and had higher attendance than expected. In 2009, voice actor Greg Ayres suffered a mild heart attack while attending the convention, and later thanked the staff for its response to the emergency. In 2015, the World Cosplay Summit held regional qualifiers at IKKiCON. The Ikkicon planned for January 2021 was cancelled due to the COVID-19 pandemic, with the convention holding an event in May 2021 instead. The convention for 2021 moved to the Austin Marriott Downtown.

IKKiCON in 2023 moved to the Kalahari Resorts and Conventions in Round Rock, Texas.

Detailed Event history

References

External links
Ikkicon Website

Anime conventions in the United States
Recurring events established in 2007
2007 establishments in Texas
Annual events in Texas
Conventions in Texas
Festivals in Texas
Japanese-American culture in Texas
Tourist attractions in Williamson County, Texas
Culture of Round Rock, Texas